The Story of Lilian Hawley (German: Der Roman der Lilian Hawley) is a 1925 German silent drama film directed by Franz W. Koebner and starring Lotte Neumann and Livio Pavanelli.

The film's sets were designed by the art director Robert Neppach.

Cast
 Lantelme Dürer as Mrs. Hawley 
 Lotte Neumann as Lilian 
 Livio Pavanelli as Mr. Hawley 
 Luigi Serventi as Jonny

References

Bibliography
 Grange, William. Cultural Chronicle of the Weimar Republic. Scarecrow Press, 2008.

External links

1925 films
1925 drama films
German drama films
Films of the Weimar Republic
German silent feature films
German black-and-white films
Silent drama films
1920s German films